Ashore is a folk album by June Tabor released in 2011 on Topic Records, catalogue number TSCD 577.

It is a collection of songs concerning humankind's relationship with the sea.

Track listing
 Finisterre (Ian Telfer)
 The Bleacher Lassie Of Kelvinhaugh (Trad. arr. Tabor)
 The Grey Funnel Line (Cyril Tawney)
 Le Vingt-Cinquième du Mois d'Octobre (Trad. arr. Tabor, Cutting, Emerson)
 Shipbuilding (Declan MacManus / Clive Langer)
 Jamaica (arr. Emerson, Cutting, Harries)
 The Great Selkie Of Sule Skerry (Trad. arr. Tabor, Warren)
 Winter Comes In (words: Jack Renwick, music: Ronald Jamieson) / Vidlin Voe (Frank Jamieson)
 The Oggie Man (Cyril Tawney)
 I'll go and enlist for a soldier (Trad. arr. Cutting, Harries)
 The Brean Lament (Trad. arr. Tabor, Warren)
 Le Petit Navire (Trad. arr. Tabor, Cutting, Emerson)
 Across The Wide Ocean (words Les Barker, tune trad)

Personnel
 June Tabor - vocals
 Andy Cutting - diatonic accordion
 Mark Emerson - viola & violin
 Tim Harries - double bass
 Huw Warren - piano

References

External links 
 Page at record label
 BBC Review by Colin Irwin
 Interview with June Tabor by Peter Paphides

June Tabor albums
2011 albums